Araz Ali Sheykh (also Romanized as Arāz ‘Alī Sheykh and Ārāz ‘Alī Sheykh; also known as Shaikh and Sheykh) is a village in Zavkuh Rural District, Pishkamar District, Kalaleh County, Golestan Province, Iran. At the 2006 census, its population was 357, in 61 families.

References 

Populated places in Kalaleh County